San Vito di Cadore is a small town and comune in the province of Belluno in the Italian region of Veneto.

The town is primarily a winter sport resort, but tourism is active also in summer. It is the last town before Cortina d'Ampezzo on the SS51 Alemagna State Road that connects Belluno to Toblach.

International relations

Twin towns / Sister cities 
  Alfonsine, Italy

References